Vermiglio (local dialect: Verméi) is a comune (municipality) in Trentino in the northern Italian region Trentino-Alto Adige/Südtirol, located about  northwest of Trento.

The municipality of Vermiglio contains the frazioni (subdivisions, mainly villages and hamlets) Pizzano, Fraviano, Cortina, Borgonuovo, Stavel, Velon and Passo del Tonale.

Vermiglio borders the following municipalities: Peio, Ponte di Legno, Ossana, Pellizzano, Giustino, Spiazzo, Strembo and Carisolo.

Demographic evolution

References

Cities and towns in Trentino-Alto Adige/Südtirol